"Tam o' Shanter" is a narrative poem written by the Scottish poet Robert Burns in 1790, while living in Dumfries. First published in 1791, at 228 (or 224) lines it is one of Burns' longer poems, and employs a mixture of Scots and English.

The poem describes the habits of Tam, a farmer who often gets drunk with his friends in a public house in the Scottish town of Ayr, and his thoughtless ways, specifically towards his wife, who is waiting at home for him, angry. At the conclusion of one such late-night revel after a market day, Tam rides home on his horse Meg/Maggie while a storm is brewing.  On the way he sees the local haunted church lit up, with witches and warlocks dancing and the Devil playing the bagpipes.  He is still drunk, still upon his horse, just on the edge of the light,  watching, amazed to see the place bedecked with many gruesome things such as gibbet irons and knives that had been used to commit murders and other macabre artifacts.  The witches are dancing as the music intensifies and, upon seeing one particularly wanton witch in a short dress he loses his reason and shouts, 'Weel done, cutty-sark!' ("cutty-sark": short shirt).  Immediately, the lights go out, the music and dancing stops and many of the creatures lunge after Tam, with the witches leading.  Tam spurs Meg to turn and flee and drives the horse on towards the River Doon as the creatures dare not cross a running stream.  The creatures give chase and the witches come so close to catching Tam and Meg that they pull Meg's tail off just as she reaches the Brig o' Doon.

Summary
The poem begins:

When chapman billies leave the street,
And  neibors, neibors, meet;
As market days are wearing late,
And folk begin to tak the gate,
While we sit bousing at the nappy,
An' getting fou and  happy,
We think na on the lang Scots miles,
The mosses, waters, slaps and stiles,
That lie between us and our hame,
Where sits our sulky, sullen dame,
Gathering her brows like gathering storm,
Nursing her wrath to keep it warm.

After Burns has located us geographically:

(Auld Ayr, wham ne'er a town surpasses,
For honest men and bonnie lasses).

(a quote that gave Ayr United F.C. their nickname "the honest men"), 
the reader is regaled with commentary by Tam's wife Kate on his drinking escapades, and with her dark forebodings:

She prophesied that late or soon,
Thou wad be found, deep drown'd in Doon,
Or catch'd wi' warlocks in the mirk,
By Alloway's auld, haunted kirk.

Such advice is too often dismissed:

Ah, gentle dames! it gars me greet,
To think how mony counsels sweet,
How mony lengthen'd, sage advices,
The husband frae the wife despises!

One market night, Tam sits in a pub, close to its ingle, and drinks with his thirsty friend, a souter: "Souter Johnny, his ancient, trusty, drouthy crony". Tam even flirts with the landlady of the pub, while Johnny's tales are punctuated by the landlord's laughter. Eventually Tam mounts up and rides off on his grey mare Meg, for his long, dark, lonely ride home. Burns emphasises the spooky character of the Ayrshire countryside Tam has to ride through—but of course it is much easier as he is drunk:

Inspiring bold John Barleycorn!
What dangers thou canst make us scorn!
Wi' tippenny, we fear nae evil;
Wi' usquabae, we'll face the devil!

With the scene set, suddenly: "wow! Tam saw an unco sight!"

The sight he sees is Alloway Kirk, ablaze with light, where a weird hallucinatory dance involving witches and warlocks, open coffins, and even the Devil himself is in full swing. The scene is bedecked in morbidly enthusiastic gothic detail. Tam manages to watch silently until, the dancing old witches having cast off most of their clothes, he is beguiled by the energetic leaping of one comely female witch, Nannie, whose shirt or chemise (cutty-sark) is too short and scanty. He cannot help shouting out in passion:

Weel done, Cutty-sark!
And in an instant all was dark:

The Devil decides to chase Tam, but the evident pride in the ability of his horse is justified as she is able to help him to "win the key-stone o' the brig". (The Devil, witches and warlocks cannot cross running water.)

They only just make it though, as Nannie, first among the "hellish legion" chasing, grabs the horse's tail, which comes off.
In fine, tongue-in-cheek moralistic mode, the poem concludes:

Now, wha this tale o' truth shall read,
Ilk man and mother's son, take heed:
Whene'er to Drink you are inclin'd,
Or Cutty-sarks rin in your mind,
Think ye may buy the joys o'er dear;
Remember Tam o' Shanter's mare

Background

The poem was written in 1790 for the second volume of Francis Grose's Antiquities of Scotland. A month before this was published, it first appeared in the Edinburgh Herald and the Edinburgh Magazine in March 1791.  Robert Riddell introduced Burns to Grose and, according to Gilbert Burns, the poet asked the antiquarian to include a drawing of Alloway Kirk when he came to Ayrshire; Grose agreed, as long as Burns gave him something to print alongside it.

Burns wrote to Grose in June 1790, giving him three witch stories associated with Alloway Kirk, two of which he said were "authentic", the third, "though equally true, being not so well identified as the two former with regard to the scene". The second of the stories was Tam o' Shanter. This is Burns' prose sketch of it to Grose:

Thus began what was to be one of Burns' most sustained poetic efforts.

The story that the poem was written in a day was perpetrated by John Gibson Lockhart, aided by Allan Cunningham. Its subtle nuances of tempo, pace and tone suggest that it had been given, as Burns told Mrs Dunlop on 11 April 1791, "a finishing polish that I despair of ever excelling".

Burns based the character of Tam O'Shanter on Douglas Graham (1739–1811), a friend who lived at Shanter Farm, about half a mile (0.8 km) inland from the fishing village of Maidens in South Ayrshire, near Kirkoswald.

The Kirkoswald souter (shoemaker) John Davidson gave Burns inspiration for the character of souter Johnnie. In 1785, Davidson had built his own cottage there, accommodating his family and business dealings, with his workshop at the back. He died in 1806. His family passed the cottage on to the National Trust for Scotland in 1932. It is preserved as a rare example of thatched roofed domestic architecture,and forms a museum and art gallery.

Revision
An early version of the poem includes four lines that were deleted at the request of one of Burns' friends. The poem originally contained the lines:

A handwritten note on the manuscript written by Judge Alexander Fraser Tytler, reads "Burns left out these four lines at my desire, as being incongruous with the other circumstances of pure horror." Burns had the lines removed from later editions; it was not unknown for Burns to make changes at the request of friends.

Cultural depictions

This poem appears to be the first mention of the name.

The Tam o' Shanter cap is named after it.

Lady Ada Lovelace named her beloved if "very wild and ... quite vicious" stallion Tom O'Shanter.

George Métivier published Tam au Sabbat, a Guernésiais version of Burns' poem, in La Gazette de Guernesey in 1855. This version was included in his collection Fantaisies guernesiaises in 1866.

In 1899, the town of Barre, Vermont erected a memorial to Burns in local granite, including a panel depicting a scene from the poem.

In 1915, the American composer George Whitefield Chadwick completed a symphonic poem inspired by the poem.

In 1955, British composer Malcolm Arnold's Overture Op. 51a was named "Tam o' Shanter" after Burns' poem.

In the 1990s, Scottish figurative painter Alexander Goudie worked at a cycle of 54 large format paintings dedicated to Robert Burns' poem, currently displayed at Rozelle House Galleries, near Burns' home at Alloway, Ayrshire.

The Tam O' Shanter Urban Cottage on Bidston Hill, Wirral, Merseyside was named after the poem in 1837 after being built beyond a stream which was said to repel witches. It attracts both Robert Burns fans and local witches and Wicca historians.

The Tam O'Shanter Inn in Los Angeles, California was named after the Robert Burns poem and was established in 1922 by the Van de Kamp bakery family. As of 2017, it is Los Angeles' oldest restaurant operated by the same family in the same location. It was Walt Disney's favorite restaurant.

"The Number of the Beast" by Iron Maiden is loosely based on the poem.

 Tamfest in Ayr, which honours Tam O'Shanter, is one of Britain’s largest festivals dedicated to a friend of Burns, name of Douglas Graham, The festival was founded in 2015 by musician and events organiser Meredith McCrindle and takes place in Ayr’s town centre with a host of family-friendly shows and interactive sessions in art, craft, and drama. Typically, the festival centres around Halloween, perhaps a natural parallel given the atmosphere created by the poem and the fate of its protagonist. Past events have included recitals by actress Karen Dunbar, an original Burns theatre production at The Gaiety Theatre in Ayr starring BAFTA winner Iain Robertson, and a popular parade that has attracted up to 8000 people to Ayr’s town centre.

See also
Witches' Sabbath
Night on Bald Mountain
Erlkönig
Cutty Sark

References
Citations

Bibliography

External links

 
 Full text of the poem from Project Gutenberg.
 A recital of Tam o' Shanter a Tale 
 Video recital of Tam o' Shanter 
 Video footage of Alloway Kirk and insights into the origins of the poem
 [For a bilingual English-Spanish edition of the poem see: https://sites.google.com/view/tam-oshanter-robert-burns/p%C3%A1gina-principal]

1790 poems
Poetry by Robert Burns
Narrative poems
Characters in poems
Witchcraft in written fiction
Fiction about the Devil